Chuathbaluk is a city in Bethel Census Area, Alaska, United States.

At the 2010 census the population was 118, down from 119 in 2000.

Geography
The Russian Mountains, a small circular mountain range, stand just to the north of the town.

Demographics

Chuathbaluk first appeared on the 1970 census as an unincorporated village. It formally incorporated in 1975. Prior to that, the community had been known as "Little Russian Mission." This was not to be confused with the present city of Russian Mission (Ikogmute) on the Yukon, so it was often called the Little Russian Mission to avoid confusion. Under the prior name, it never reported a population separately.

As of the census of 2000, there were 119 people, 33 households, and 23 families residing in the city. There were 43 housing units at an average density of 12.2 per square mile (4.7/km2). The racial makeup of the city was 5.04% White, 91.60% Native American, 0.84% from other races, and 2.52% from two or more races.

There were 33 households, out of which 45.5% had children under the age of 18 living with them, 30.3% were married couples living together, 27.3% had a female householder with no husband present, and 27.3% were non-families. 21.2% of all households were made up of individuals, and 3.0% had someone living alone who was 65 years of age or older. The average household size was 3.61 and the average family size was 4.21.

In the city, the age distribution of the population shows 42.9% under the age of 18, 8.4% from 18 to 24, 28.6% from 25 to 44, 16.0% from 45 to 64, and 4.2% who were 65 years of age or older. The median age was 23 years. For every 100 females, there were 91.9 males. For every 100 females age 18 and over, there were 106.1 males.

The median income for a household in the city was $34,286, and the median income for a family was $34,167. Males had a median income of $46,250 versus $28,750 for females. The per capita income for the city was $10,100. There were 16.7% of families and 24.1% of the population living below the poverty line, including 27.5% of under eighteens and none of those over 64.

History
During the 19th century, Deg Hit'an Athabascan people had summer fish camps in the area. The Russian Orthodox Church built the St. Sergius Mission by 1894, and residents of Kukuktuk from  downriver moved to the mission.

Once established, village has been called Chukbak, St. Sergius Mission, Kuskokwim Russian Mission, and Little Russian Mission. The village was often confused with Russian Mission on the Yukon, so in the 1960s the name was changed to Chuathbaluk, which is derived from the Yup'ik word Curapalek, meaning "the hills where the big blueberries grow."

Much of the village was lost in an influenza epidemic in 1900. By 1929, the site was deserted, although Russian Orthodox members continued to hold services at the mission. In 1954, the Crow Village Sam Phillips family from Crow Village resettled the mission, and later residents of Aniak and Crooked Creek joined their settlement. The church was rebuilt in the late 1950s, and a state school opened in the 1960s. The city was incorporated in 1975.

References

Cities in Alaska
Cities in Bethel Census Area, Alaska